Nikolayevsk is a town and the administrative center of Nikolayevsky District in Volgograd Oblast, Russia, located on the left (eastern) shore of the Volga River. Population:

History
It was founded in 1747 as the khutor of Dmitriyev, which was reorganized into a sloboda in 1794 and renamed Nikolayevskaya sloboda. It was granted town status and renamed Nikolayevsk in 1967.

Administrative and municipal status
Within the framework of administrative divisions, Nikolayevsk serves as the administrative center of Nikolayevsky District. As an administrative division, it is incorporated within Nikolayevsky District as the town of district significance of Nikolayevsk. As a municipal division, the town of district significance of Nikolayevsk is incorporated within Nikolayevsky Municipal District as Nikolayevsk Urban Settlement.

References

Notes

Sources

External links

Cities and towns in Volgograd Oblast
Populated places on the Volga
Populated places established in 1747